Jamie Thompson (29 May 1892 – 12 July 1975) was an  Australian rules footballer who played with Geelong in the Victorian Football League (VFL).

References

External links 

1892 births
1975 deaths
Australian rules footballers from Victoria (Australia)
Geelong Football Club players
Geelong West Football Club players